The dandy horse, a derogatory term for what was first called a Laufmaschine (in German), then a vélocipède or draisienne (in French and then English), and then a pedestrian curricle or hobby-horse, or swiftwalker, is a human-powered vehicle that, being the first means of transport to make use of the two-wheeler principle, is regarded as the forerunner of the bicycle. The dandy horse is a foot-propelled vehicle, powered by the rider's feet on the ground instead of the pedals of later bicycles.  It was invented by Karl Drais (who called it a Laufmaschine [, "running machine"]) in 1817, and then patented by him in France in February 1818 using the term vélocipède. It is also known as a Draisine ( in German, a term used in English only for light auxiliary railcars regardless of their form of propulsion), and as a draisienne ( in French and English. In English, it is also sometimes still known as a velocipede, but that term now also has a broader meaning.

History
The dandy-horse was a two-wheeled vehicle, with both wheels in line, propelled by the rider pushing along the ground with the feet as in regular walking or running. The front wheel and handlebar assembly was hinged to allow steering. The dandy horse was capable of more than doubling the average walking speed, to around 10 mph (16 km/h) on level ground.

Drais was inspired, at least in part, by the need to develop a form of transit that did not rely on the horse. After the eruption of Mount Tambora and the Year Without a Summer (1816), which followed close on the devastation of the Napoleonic Wars, widespread crop failures and food shortages resulted in the deaths of tens of thousands of horses, which either starved to death or were killed to provide meat and hides. "In wartime," he wrote, "when horses and their fodder often become scarce, a small fleet of such wagons at each corps could be important, especially for dispatches over short distances and for carrying the wounded.”

Several manufacturers in France and England made their own dandy-horses during its brief popularity in the summer of 1819—most notably Denis Johnson  of London, who used an elegantly curved wooden frame that allowed the use of larger wheels. In the United States, a patent for a two-wheeled human-powered vehicle was awarded to W.K. Clarkson of New York on June 26, 1819. However, in 1836, a fire in the U.S. Patent Office destroyed the only surviving drawings, and a prototype of the invention was never built by Clarkson. 

Dandy horses first appeared on the footpaths of Mannheim, Germany, in 1820. They were heavy and cumbersome, and as a result, riders preferred to operate their vehicles on the smooth pavements instead of the rough roads. Their interactions with pedestrians caused many municipalities worldwide to enact laws prohibiting their use, and in New York City, a law was passed that banned dandy horses from all footpaths and public places. Later designs avoided the initial drawback of this device when it had to be made to measure, manufactured to conform with the height and the stride of its rider. An example is Nicéphore Niépce's 1818 model with an adjustable saddle for his 'velocipede' built by Lagrange.

However, in the 1860s in France, the vélocipède bicycle was created by attaching rotary cranks and pedals to the front-wheel hub of a dandy-horse.

Modern adaptation

The dandy horse has been adapted as a starter bicycle for children, and it variously is called a balance bike or run bike.

Literature
 H.E.Lessing: How sophisticated was the draisine? The Boneshaker #159 (2002)
 T.Hadland and H.E.Lessing: Bicycle Design - An Illustrated History, MIT Press, Cambridge; MA 2014
 C.Reynaud: L'Ère de la Draisienne en France 1818-1870, Éditions Musée Vélo-Moto, Domazan 2015

See also
 Balance bicycle
 Outline of cycling
 Velocipede

References

External links

New Scientist issue 2484, 29 January 2005, "Histories: Brimstone and bicycles"

Cycle types
Vehicles introduced in 1818
1818 in Germany
History of cycling